Sir Adolphus John Dalrymple, 2nd Baronet of High Mark (3 February 1784 – 3 March 1866) was a British army officer and politician.

Early life
Aldolphus Dalrymple was the eldest son of Sir Hew Whiteford Dalrymple and his wife Frances nee Leighton, and was born in St Marylebone. At the time of his birth his father was an officer in the 1st Foot Guards. Adolphus attended Harrow School from 1796 to 1799.

Military career
Dalrymple's father was able to use his social and military connections to advance his son's career in the army. In 1799 Sir Hew was Lieutenant Governor of Guernsey and he obtained a commission for Adolphus, than aged 15, in the 55th (Westmorland) Regiment of Foot that was stationed on the island. In the following year he was promoted to full lieutenant in the 37th (North Hampshire) Regiment of Foot of which his father was colonel, and was appointed his aide de camp.

In February 1801 he exchanged to the 1st King's Dragoon Guards, then stationed in England. He quickly obtained another staff appointment as aide de camp to Lieutenant-General Sir James Craig, commanding the Eastern District of England. He was promoted to captain in the 18th Light Dragoons at the beginning of 1803, but had returned to Craig's staff within six months. He remained as the general's aide de camp until May 1806, serving in Malta, Sicily, and Naples.

In June 1806 he was appointed military secretary to his father, by then Lieutenant-Governor of Gibraltar. Sir Hew was subsequently appointed to command British forces in Portugal fighting the French, but signed the Convention of Cintra in August 1808 that allowed the defeated French safe passage out of the country. The signing of the convention by his father was seen as a major humiliation by the British public, and Adolphus's military career suffered. Although he was able to purchase promotions as a major in the 3rd (East Kent) Regiment of Foot and the 19th Light Dragoons and as a lieutenant colonel in the 60th (Royal American) Regiment of Foot, he never saw active service again and transferred to the half pay list in 1814.

Parliamentary career
In 1812 Dalrymple married Anne, daughter of Sir James Graham, 1st Baronet, of Kirkstall, member of parliament for Carlisle. His father-in-law was able to assist him in obtaining a seat in the Commons in 1817 when a vacancy arose at Weymouth and Melcombe Regis. He lost the seat, however, at the 1818 general election. A year later he obtained another seat at Appleby, where his father-in-law was recorder of the borough. In 1826 he changed constituencies to become MP for Haddington Burghs, succeeding a relative, Sir Hew Dalrymple-Hamilton, 4th Baronet. In 1830 his father, who had been created a baronet in 1815, died. Adolphus accordingly inherited the title to become the 2nd Baronet. In the same year he was promoted to colonel and appointed aide de camp to William IV. He lost his Commons seat at the 1832 general election.

In 1837 he returned to parliament as one of Brighton's two MPs. In the same year he became aide de camp to the new monarch, Queen Victoria. He held the post until 1841, in which year he also lost his Commons seat.

Later life
Although no longer active in the army, Dalrymple continued to receive promotions: to major general in 1841, lieutenant general in 1851 and general in 1860. He had a number of homes: High Mark in Wigtownshire, which he had inherited from his father, a
house in Grosvenor Square, London, another in Brunswick Terrace, Brighton and Delrow House, Aldenham, Hertfordshire. He died at his Hertfordshire home in 1866 aged 82. As he had no children, the baronetcy expired on his death. He was buried in the family vault at St John's Church, Aldenham.

References

Baronets in the Baronetage of the United Kingdom
1784 births
1866 deaths
Members of the Parliament of the United Kingdom for Scottish constituencies
Members of the Parliament of the United Kingdom for English constituencies
UK MPs 1812–1818
UK MPs 1818–1820
UK MPs 1820–1826
UK MPs 1826–1830
UK MPs 1830–1831
UK MPs 1837–1841
People educated at Harrow School
55th Regiment of Foot officers
37th Regiment of Foot officers
1st King's Dragoon Guards officers
18th Royal Hussars officers
Royal American Regiment officers
Buffs (Royal East Kent Regiment) officers
19th Light Dragoons officers
British Army generals
People from Marylebone
People from Aldenham